Buntine is a small town located in the Wheatbelt region of Western Australia, about  north of Perth, the state capital, along the Great Northern Highway within the Shire of Dalwallinu.

The name Buntine was first used in 1910 as the name of a nearby hill.  In 1913, it was applied to a railway siding on the line between Wongan Hills and Mullewa, at the suggestion of District Surveyor J P Camm.  The town of Buntine was gazetted in 1916.

In 1932 the Wheat Pool of Western Australia announced that the town would have two grain elevators, each fitted with an engine, installed at the railway siding.

A local bulk wheat bin was opened in the town in December 1949 just in time for the harvesting season with  being received on the first day.

References

External links

Towns in Western Australia
Populated places established in 1916
1916 establishments in Australia
Shire of Dalwallinu